Sanjay Gaikwad is an Indian politician serving as a MLA in Maharashtra Legislative Assembly from Buldhana Vidhan Sabha constituency as a member of Shiv Sena.

Positions held
 2019: Elected to Maharashtra Legislative Assembly

References

External links
  Shivsena Home Page 

Year of birth missing (living people)
Living people
Maharashtra politicians
Shiv Sena politicians